The Vachina Apartments-California Apartments, at 45 California Ave. in Reno, Nevada, is a historic Classical Revival work of architect Frederick J. DeLongchamps.  It was built in 1922.
It was listed on the National Register of Historic Places in 1986.

References 

Residential buildings on the National Register of Historic Places in Nevada
Neoclassical architecture in Nevada
Residential buildings completed in 1922
Buildings and structures in Reno, Nevada
Frederic Joseph DeLongchamps buildings
National Register of Historic Places in Reno, Nevada